Heroes Never Die may refer to:

Heroesneverdie.com, Polygon website for video game Overwatch
Cyborgs: Heroes Never Die, 2017 Ukrainian war drama film

See also
A Hero Never Dies